The Former Residence of Wang Zhen or Wang Zhen's Former Residence was built in the late Qing dynasty (1644–1911). It is located in Mazhan Village of Beisheng Town in Liuyang, Hunan, China.  The building was the birthplace and childhood home of Wang Zhen, who was one of the Eight Elders of the Chinese Communist Party.

History
In 1908, Wang Zhen was born here.

In 1940, the building was washed away by the flood.

In 2007, the local government rebuilt it.

In 2008, it was listed as a municipality protected historic site and patriotism education bases by the Changsha Municipal People's Government.

Gallery

References

External links

Buildings and structures in Liuyang
Tourist attractions in Changsha
Traditional folk houses in Hunan